Max Svensson may refer to:
Max Svensson (footballer, born 1998), Swedish football winger for Helsingborgs
Max Svensson (footballer, born 2001), Spanish football striker for Espanyol